This is a list of Bowling Green Falcons baseball seasons. The Bowling Green Falcons baseball team represents Bowling Green State University and this list documents the season-by-season records of the Falcons from 1915 to the present including conference and national post season records. Bowling Green's baseball program fielded its first varsity team in 1921. From 1921 until 1932, Bowling Green was a member of the Northwest Ohio League and was an independent until 1953 when the school joined the Mid-American Conference. The Falcons were in the East Division of the MAC from 2006 to 2017 until the MAC eliminated divisions. 

The Falcons have appeared in four NCAA tournaments in 1972, 1998, 1999 and 2013.  The program has won seven NWOIAA championships and has been named MAC regular season conference champions seven times and its tournament champion three times.

From 1915 until 1926, the athletic programs at Bowling Green were known as the Normals, after the institution's original name Bowling Green State Normal School.

Season results

Notes

Sources:

References 

Bowling Green
Bowling Green Falcons baseball seasons